Time Signs is a British television series that aired on Channel 4 in 1991. Presented by Mick Aston, the series tells the story of a Devon valley throughout history. Phil Harding does some reconstruction archaeology. The series was narrated by Ray Brooks.

Time Signs was later developed into Time Team, the long-running archaeology television programme that aired from 1994 to 2014. Time Team has the same producer and also features Mick Aston and Phil Harding.

Production
Time Signs was created in 1988 when producer Tim Taylor asked Mick Aston to present Time Signs, a history and archaeology series that tells the story of Wolf Valley in Devon. Aston asked archaeologist Phil Harding to do some reconstruction archaeology. Time Signs was filmed at what is now the Roadford Reservoir in Devon.

Episodes
The four thirty-minute episodes aired from 30 June to 21 July 1991 on Channel 4. The series works back from the modern day to prehistoric times to explain the valley's history.

References

External links 
 

1991 British television series debuts
1991 British television series endings
Archaeology of the United Kingdom
Channel 4 original programming
English-language television shows
Time Team